Metulella is a genus of sea snails, marine gastropod mollusks in the family Columbellidae, the dove snails.

Species
Species within the genus Metulella include:
 Metulella columbellata (Dall, 1889)
 † Metulella fusiformis Gabb, 1873 
 † Metulella venusta (G. B. Sowerby I, 1850)

References

 Pelorce J. (2017). Les Columbellidae (Gastropoda: Neogastropoda) de la Guyane française. Xenophora Taxonomy. 14: 4-21.

External links
 Gabb W.M. (1873). Description of some new genera of Mollusca. Proceedings of the Academy of Natural Sciences of Philadelphia. 24: 270–274, pls 9–11

Columbellidae